Oerane microthyrus is a species of butterfly in the family Hesperiidae. It was described by Paul Mabille in 1883 and is found in the Indomalayan realm. The larvae feed on Daemonorops oblongus.

Subspecies
O. m. microthyrus - (Malaysia to the Philippines)
O. m. neaera (de Nicéville, 1891) - (Burma, Thailand, Malaysia, Borneo, Sumatra, Banka, Java)

References

External links
Oerane Elwes & Edwards, 1897 at Markku Savela's Lepidoptera and Some Other Life Forms

Hesperiinae
Insects described in 1883